Selen Öndeş (born February 1, 1988 in Samsun) is a Turkish volleyball player. She is 186 cm. She has played for Fenerbahçe Women's Volleyball Team since 2006 and wears number 15. She played 6 times for the Turkish national team. She also played for Yalovaspor.

See also
 Turkish women in sports

External links
 Player profile at fenerbahce.org

1988 births
Living people
Sportspeople from Samsun
Turkish women's volleyball players
Fenerbahçe volleyballers